Robert Roosevelt Jones (September 9, 1907 – July 27, 1982), nicknamed "Sug", was an American Negro league first baseman in the 1930s.

A native of Dubach, Louisiana, Jones played for the Little Rock Grays in 1932. In 11 recorded games, he posted 16 hits in 45 plate appearances. Jones died in Jonesboro, Arkansas in 1982 at age 74.

References

External links
 and Seamheads 
 Sug Jones at Arkansas Baseball Encyclopedia

1907 births
1982 deaths
Little Rock Grays players
20th-century African-American sportspeople